Eugène Leclercq (1832–1908) was Draughts World Championship from 1895 to 1899. At that time the championship was an international tournament held in France. He also wrote about the game.

References 

French draughts players
Players of international draughts
1832 births
1908 deaths